Dinelson Lamet Hernandez (born July 18, 1992) nicknamed "El Flaco", is a Dominican professional baseball pitcher for the Colorado Rockies of Major League Baseball (MLB). He made his MLB debut in 2017 with the San Diego Padres.

Career

San Diego Padres (2014–2022)
An international free agent, Lamet agreed to a contract with the Philadelphia Phillies in 2012, but a problem with his documentation prevented the deal from being completed. The San Diego Padres signed Lamet in June 2014 for a $100,000 signing bonus. He made his professional debut with the Dominican Summer Padres of the Dominican Summer League, and pitched to a 2.99 earned run average (ERA) for the Fort Wayne TinCaps of the Class A Midwest League in 2015. In 2016, Lamet began the season with the Lake Elsinore Storm of the Class A-Advanced California League.

The Padres promoted Lamet to the San Antonio Missions of the Class AA Texas League and then to the El Paso Chihuahuas of the Class AAA Pacific Coast League. Lamet finished 2016 posting a 12–10 win–loss record with a 3.00 ERA. He returned to El Paso to start the 2017 season. Lamet made his major league debut on May 25. After being named to the Padres' Opening Day roster in 2018, Lamet injured the ulnar collateral ligament (UCL) in the elbow of his throwing arm. He underwent Tommy John surgery and missed the 2018 season.

In 2019, Lamet played for Lake Elsinore and El Paso before being activated from the injured list on July 4. In 14 starts, Lamet recorded an ERA of 4.07 with a record of 3–5. He struck out 105 batters in 73 innings. In 2020, Lamet finished the season with a 3–1 record and a 2.09 ERA, in 12 starts. However, he was unavailable for the playoffs due to a bicep injury.

After spending the beginning of the 2021 season recovering from a UCL sprain, Lamet made his season debut as the starting pitcher against the Milwaukee Brewers on April 21, 2021. However, he was removed from the start after two innings and 29 pitches after experiencing right forearm tightness. Lamet pitched in 22 games in the 2021 season, only nine of which were starts. He recorded a 4.40 ERA and 57 strikeouts in 47 innings.

Milwaukee Brewers (2022)
On August 1, 2022, the Padres traded Lamet, Taylor Rogers, Esteury Ruiz, and Robert Gasser to the Milwaukee Brewers for Josh Hader. The Brewers designated Lamet for assignment on August 3; Brewers general manager said "the roster fit became a little tougher" after the team made subsequent transactions at the August 2 trade deadline.

Colorado Rockies (2022–present)
The Colorado Rockies claimed Lamet off of waivers on August 5, 2022.

References

External links

1992 births
Living people
Colorado Rockies players
Dominican Republic expatriate baseball players in the United States
Dominican Summer League Padres players
El Paso Chihuahuas players
Fort Wayne TinCaps players
Lake Elsinore Storm players
Major League Baseball pitchers
Major League Baseball players from the Dominican Republic
People from Santiago de los Caballeros
San Antonio Missions players
San Diego Padres players